This list is of the Places of Scenic Beauty of Japan located within the Urban Prefecture of Kyōto.

National Places of Scenic Beauty
As of 1 January 2021, sixty-two Places have been designated at a national level (including fourteen *Special Places of Scenic Beauty).

Prefectural Places of Scenic Beauty
As of 1 May 2020, twenty Places have been designated at a prefectural level.

Municipal Places of Scenic Beauty
As of 1 May 2020, forty-four Places have been designated at a municipal level.

Registered Places of Scenic Beauty - National
As of 1 January 2021, zero Monuments have been registered (as opposed to designated) as Places of Scenic Beauty at a national level.

Registered Places of Scenic Beauty - Prefectural
As of 1 April 2020, one Monument has been registered (as opposed to designated) as a Place of Scenic Beauty at a prefectural level.

Registered Places of Scenic Beauty - Municipal
Monuments registered (as opposed to designated) as Places of Scenic Beauty at a municipal level include:

See also
 Cultural Properties of Japan
 List of Historic Sites of Japan (Kyōto)
 List of parks and gardens of Kyoto Prefecture
 List of Cultural Properties of Japan - paintings (Kyōto)
 List of Cultural Properties of Japan - historical materials (Kyōto)

References

External links
  Cultural Properties of Kyoto Prefecture
  Cultural Properties of Kyōto Prefecture
  Municipal Places of Scenic Beauty of Kyōto City

Tourist attractions in Kyoto Prefecture
Places of Scenic Beauty